Southern Express is an American transportation company dealing with charter bus services and related passenger transportation services. Based in the Raleigh/Durham area of North Carolina, the company was founded in 2009 by Bruce Bechard and Vance Hoover.

Cities served
Main cities and towns served are:

 Raleigh, North Carolina
 Durham, North Carolina
 Chapel Hill, North Carolina
 Research Triangle Park, North Carolina
 Apex, North Carolina
 Cary, North Carolina
 Fayetteville, North Carolina
 Greensboro, North Carolina
 Rocky Mount, North Carolina
 Wake Forest, North Carolina
 Wilson, North Carolina

Airports served
Main airports served are:

 Raleigh-Durham International Airport
 Fayetteville Regional Airport
 Albert J. Ellis Airport
 Piedmont Triad International Airport
 Charlotte/Douglas International Airport

External links
SaferSys Web
United Motorcoach Association
Southern Express
Daimler Buses North America - Setra

Transport companies established in 2009
Bus companies of the United States
Companies based in Durham, North Carolina